Wólka Gruszczyńska  is a village in the administrative district of Gmina Wilga, within Garwolin County, Masovian Voivodeship, in east-central Poland.

The village has a population of 147.

The country has recently been trying to encourage tourism in the area, as it has begun to literally fade out of  existence.

References

Villages in Garwolin County